Bidania-Goiatz is a town located in the province of Gipuzkoa, in the Autonomous Community of Basque Country, in the North of Spain.

It consists of the two villages of Bidania and Goiatz. Bidania is known for having an organ built by Aristide Cavaillé-Coll in its church.

References

External links
 Official Website Information available in Spanish and Basque.
 Bidania-Goiatz in the Bernardo Estornés Lasa - Auñamendi Encyclopedia (Euskomedia Fundazioa) Information available in Spanish

Municipalities in Gipuzkoa